

Results

Green denotes finalists

References

Women's 1 metre springboard
Euro